7th Sea may refer to:

7th Sea (role-playing game), a 1999 swashbuckler game
7th Sea (collectible card game), a 1999 game based on the RPG

See also
Seven Seas